There have been six ships of the Royal Navy  named HMS Lancaster:

  was an 80-gun first rate built in 1694, then rebuilt and relaunched in 1722, and rebuilt for a third time to a 66-gun third rate in 1749.
  was an East Indiaman, fitted out as a third rate 64-gun ship in 1797.
  was a frigate of 1823, scrapped in 1864.
 , formerly , was a  transferred as part of the 1940 Destroyers for Bases Agreement.
 , a Type 23 frigate commissioned in 1992 and currently in service.

Battle honours 
Ships that have borne the name Lancaster for the Royal Navy have earned the following battle honours;

 Louisburg 1758
 Camperdown 1797
 Atlantic 1941
 Arctic 1942
 North Sea 1943–45

Royal Navy ship names